Khalid Al-Estashi (born 19 March 1974) is a Yemeni long-distance runner who competed internationally for Yemen at the 1992 Summer Olympics.

Career
Al-Estashi was still a teenager when he competed in the 10,000 metres at the 1992 Summer Olympics held in Barcelona, Spain, he finished his heat in 26th place out 28 that started so didn't qualify for the final.

References

External links
 

1974 births
Living people
Yemeni male long-distance runners
Olympic athletes of Yemen
Athletes (track and field) at the 1992 Summer Olympics